Shannon Tindle is an American animator, storyboard artist, television writer, screenwriter, and film director. Tindle's work on the television series Foster's Home for Imaginary Friends received an Annie Award nomination in 2005 for Best Character Design in an Animated Television Production.  Later, at the 58th Primetime Emmy Awards in 2006, he won the Emmy Award for Outstanding Individual Achievement in Animation for "Go Goo Go", while the episode was also nominated for Outstanding Animated Program (for Programming Less Than One Hour).

Tindle most recently worked as a character designer on Sony Pictures Animation's The Emoji Movie; DreamWorks Animation' The Croods, as a story developer; and Laika's Kubo and the Two Strings, which he originally developed with his wife Megan. He currently lives in California, United States.

He is currently directing a CG-animated Ultraman film for Netflix.

Work

Character designer

TV Shows
 Static Shock (2000) 2 episodes
 The Fairly OddParents (2002-2003) 4 episodes
 Samurai Jack (2003) 1 episode
 The Proud Family (2002; 2005) 2 episodes
 Foster's Home for Imaginary Friends  (2005-2008) 11 episodes, supervising (2005-2006) 8 episodes
 Re-Animated (2006) (TV Movie)
 Foster's Home for Imaginary Friends: Destination Imagination (2008) (TV Movie)
 The Powerpuff Girls Rule! (2008) (TV Movie)

Films
 Curious George (2006)
 Coraline (2009)
 The Croods (2013)
 Turbo (2013)
 Kubo and the Two Strings (2016)
 The Emoji Movie (2017)
 The Boss Baby: Family Business (2021)
 Paws of Fury: The Legend of Hank (2022)

Storyboard Artist
 Kubo and the Two Strings (2016)

Writer
 Foster's Home for Imaginary Friends (2006-2007) 3 episodes
 Kubo and the Two Strings (2016)

Visual Development Artist
 Mr. Peabody & Sherman (2014)

Other
 Samurai Jack (2003) (property designer)

References

External links
Official blog

American animators
American television directors
American animated film directors
Emmy Award winners
Living people
Year of birth missing (living people)